La Laguna may also refer to:

Places
La Laguna, Arizona
La Laguna, Chalatenango
La Laguna (Los Llanos de Aridane), La Palma, Canary Islands
La Laguna, Panama
La Laguna, Veraguas, Panama
Comarca Lagunera, in Mexico
Pajares de la Laguna
San Cristóbal de La Laguna, a.k.a. La Laguna
San Juan La Laguna
San Marcos La Laguna
San Pablo La Laguna
San Pedro La Laguna
Santa Clara La Laguna
Santa Cruz La Laguna

Other
Tomás de la Cerda, 3rd Marquis of la Laguna (1638–1692)
Sancho de la Cerda, 1st Marquis of la Laguna (1550–1626), Spanish nobleman and diplomat
Arroyo de la Laguna
Rancho La Laguna
Roman Catholic Diocese of San Cristóbal de La Laguna
Sierra de la Laguna dry forests
Sierra de la Laguna pine-oak forests
Sierra de la Laguna
University of La Laguna, oldest university in the Canary Islands
Battle of San Cristóbal de La Laguna

See also 
Laguna (disambiguation)